Mr. Hollywood may refer to:

Charles E. Toberman, real estate developer
Cecil B. DeMille, film mogul
Slang for show business workers, especially those who work on films.

Music
Mr. Hollywood Jr., 1947, album by Michael Penn
"Mr. Hollywood", song by Joji from Nectar, 2020